Laverne W. Schroeder (April 14, 1933 - December 20, 2019) was an American politician in the state of Iowa.

Schroeder was born near McClelland, Iowa. He is a veteran of the Korean War and is a farmer. He served in the Iowa House of Representatives from 1967 to 1985 as a Republican.

References

1933 births
2019 deaths
Republican Party members of the Iowa House of Representatives
People from Pottawattamie County, Iowa
American military personnel of the Korean War
Farmers from Iowa